The International Journal of Offender Therapy and Comparative Criminology is a peer-reviewed academic journal that publishes papers in the field of criminology. The journal's editor-in-chief is Mark T. Palermo ([The Law Art and Behavior Foundation] and Medical College of Wisconsin). It was established in 1966 and is currently published by SAGE Publications.

Abstracting and indexing 
International Journal of Offender Therapy and Comparative Criminology is abstracted and indexed in Scopus and the Social Sciences Citation Index. According to the Journal Citation Reports, its 2017 impact factor is 1.452, ranking it 48 out of 82 journals in the category "Psychology, Applied" and 33 out of 61 in "Criminology & Penology", and 25 out of 57 journals in the category "Criminology & Penology".

References

External links 
 

SAGE Publishing academic journals
English-language journals
Criminology journals
Publications established in 1972